The Kinderhook Reformed Dutch Church located in Kinderhook, New York, was the sixth Church between Albany, New York and New York City.  It was organized in 1712.  Its cemetery, in a separate location one mile northwest of the church, contains the grave of President Martin Van Buren.

External links
 Church website

Reformed Church in America churches in New York (state)
Religious organizations established in 1712
Martin Van Buren
Dutch Reformed Church
Churches in Columbia County, New York
Dutch-American culture in New York (state)